Tuchman is a surname. Notable people with the surname include:

Barbara W. Tuchman (1912–1989), American historian, journalist, lecturer and author
Kenneth D. Tuchman (born 1959), American businessman
Walter Tuchman, cryptographer
Jessica Tuchman Mathews (born 1946), American international affairs expert

See also
Tuckman